Verin Giratagh is an abandoned village in the Kajaran Municipality of Syunik Province of Armenia.

Demographics 
Statistical Committee of Armenia reported that both the village of Verin Giratagh and the former community were uninhabited at the 2001 and 2011 censuses.

References 

Former populated places in Syunik Province